Ivana Valešová (born 29 November 1963 in Liberec) is a Czech former alpine skier who competed for Czechoslovakia in the 1984 Winter Olympics.

References

External links
 

1963 births
Living people
Czechoslovak female alpine skiers
Czech female alpine skiers
Olympic alpine skiers of Czechoslovakia
Alpine skiers at the 1984 Winter Olympics
Universiade medalists in alpine skiing
Sportspeople from Liberec
Universiade silver medalists for the Czech Republic
Competitors at the 1987 Winter Universiade